

References

USGS Fips55 database

See also

List of cities in California
List of counties in California